Maria Lourdes Jalandoni Salvador (January 1, 1948 – December 9, 2018), better known by her screen name Alona Alegre, was a Filipina movie actress whose parents were the stage impressario Lou Salvador and LVN actress Inday Jalandoni. She was among the 102 children fathered by Lou Salvador whose notable progeny includes Lou Salvador Jr., Phillip Salvador and Ross Rival.

She made her film debut as a seven-year-old child star in the 1955 movie Tagapagmana under LVN Pictures.

Life
Salvador was born in the Philippines in 1948. She died on December 9, 2018.

Political views
Salvador became a pro-Ferdinand Marcos activist. She led a rally of Marcos loyalists at the Plaza Nuestra Señora de Guia in Ermita, Manila on May 1, 1987, and was charged with rebellion by the Northern Police District in the same year for her alleged participation in the January 27 takeover of the GMA Network television station.

Filmography

References

External links

A gathering of stars still crazy after all the years

1948 births
2018 deaths
20th-century Filipino actresses
Deaths from asthma
Respiratory disease deaths in the Philippines
Alona